David A. Brancaccio (born May 17, 1960) is an American radio and television journalist. He is the host of the public radio business program Marketplace Morning Report and the PBS newsmagazine Now.

Biography

Early years
Brancaccio was born in New York City and grew up in Waterville, Maine. His father is Italian American and his mother is Ashkenazi Jewish American. He began his career in broadcasting on WTVL radio in 1976 at the age of fifteen. He received a Bachelor of Arts in African Studies and History from Wesleyan University in 1982 and a master's in journalism from Stanford University in 1988.  He traveled widely, spending his fourth grade in Rome, his ninth grade in Fort Dauphin, Madagascar and his senior year in college in Legon, Ghana.

Career
In 1989, Brancaccio began contributing to the public radio program Marketplace. He was first named as the program's European editor based in London. Brancaccio became senior editor and host of Marketplace in 1993. From London, Brancaccio also contributed diplomatic and feature coverage for the radio service of the Christian Science Monitor. During Brancaccio's tenure as host, Marketplace received the DuPont-Columbia Award (1998) and the George Foster Peabody Award (2001). He anchored the television newsmagazine, California Connected, that aired on many Californian PBS stations, from 2002 to 2003.

In 2003, Brancaccio left Marketplace to join Bill Moyers on Now. Brancaccio was co-host for over a year prior to Moyers' retirement at the end of 2004. On his last Now broadcast, Moyers had this to say about Brancaccio:

Among his beats: business innovation and the economy, politics, human rights, national security, the environment, health care, and science policy.

In 2007, Brancaccio won a national Emmy for coverage of a public health story in Kenya.  In 2009, he won a Walter Cronkite Award for excellence in television political coverage. He also holds the David Brower award for Environmental Coverage from the Sierra Club. In 2005, Brancaccio conducted the last, long-form television interview with the legendary author Kurt Vonnegut. The last episode of Now was broadcast April 30, 2010.

Brancaccio is a contributor to several broadcast, electronic, and print media, including CNN, CNBC, MSNBC, The Wall Street Journal, The Nightly Business Report, Wall Street Week with Fortune, The Baltimore Sun and Psychology Today.  In 2000, his book, Squandering Aimlessly, was published, his account of a pilgrimage across America to learn how Americans apply their personal values to their money. He also lectures widely about the future of the economy and the role of journalism in a democracy.

Brancaccio's documentary film Fixing the Future, directed by Emmy winning filmmaker Ellen Spiro, exploring more sustainable options for the economy, was released in theaters in 2012.

In 2011, Brancaccio returned to American Public Media's Marketplace as a correspondent covering new economy issues and tech/innovation. He is now host and senior editor of the popular business program The Marketplace Morning Report from 6:51 am Eastern to 7:51 am Pacific on public radio stations nationwide.

Personal life
Brancaccio lives in South Orange, New Jersey, with his wife, Mary, an educator and poet. He is an avid photographer and bicyclist.

Awards
 2018 Gerald Loeb Award for Audio for "Robot-Proof Jobs" produced for Marketplace.

Bibliography

References

External links

 David Brancaccio's official website
 Now website
 
 Marketplace's farewell to David, featuring a timeline, slideshow, and audio clips
 "Robot-Proof Jobs", 2018 Gerald Loeb Award winner for Audio

American television news anchors
PBS people
People from Waterville, Maine
Public Radio International personalities
Stanford University alumni
Wesleyan University alumni
1960 births
Living people
People from South Orange, New Jersey
Gerald Loeb Award winners for Audio and Video
21st-century American journalists